Vidisha Baliyan (born 1997) is a motivational speaker, beauty pageant winner, retired tennis player, and founder of the Spandan Welfare Society. She represented India at the 2017 Summer Deaflympics and also represented India at the 2019 Miss & Mister Deaf World contest. On 19 July 2019, she won the Miss Deaf World Contest and became the first ever Indian to be crowned as a Miss Deaf World.

Early life 
Vidisha was born on 21 August 1997 and was diagnosed with partial hearing impairment at birth. Her parents refused to send her to a special school despite medical advice. She attended the MN Public School in Muzaffarnagar for her primary education. She faced discrimination from the other students due to her deafness. She has completed her graduation in Physical Education from Noida. She has pursued her postgraduation in Yoga and History as well.

Deaflympic career 
She pursued her career by playing tennis at the national level. She most notably claimed two silver medals at the 2016 National Games before being called up to take part in the 2017 Summer Deaflympics, her first Deaflympic event. She competed in women's singles and doubles events at the 2017 Deaflympics. She was placed fifth in the women's doubles event. It is reported that Vidisha decided to retire from playing tennis citing severe back injuries following the 2017 Summer Deaflympics.

Modeling career 
Vidisha Baliyan decided to take part in the Miss Deaf India contest following her retirement from tennis. She was reported to have had training sessions in Greater Noida for over a year to participate in Miss Deaf India 2019. She eventually won the Miss Deaf India 2019 contest which was held in Assam, Guwahati in February 2019. After emerging as Miss Deaf India, she qualified to take part in the Miss Deaf World 2019 contest and headed to South Africa. She also received the assistance from Wheeling Happiness Foundation which is run by 2016 Summer Paralympics silver medalist Deepa Malik.

She was one of the many contestants to have participated in the Miss Deaf World contest and was crowned Miss Deaf World for the year 2019. Vidisha went on to become the first Indian to win the Miss Deaf World 2019.

Achievements 

She is the first Indian woman to win the title of Miss Deaf World in 2019. She is a great motivational speaker and expert in many fields, including Dancing, Tennis, and Fashion. She got National Disability Award from the honorable Vice President of India. She is the Brand Ambassador of Women Empowerment in Arsh Kanya Gurukul. She is also the brand ambassador of Phonak Nadia. Her list of achievements and accolades talks at length about her ambitious personality.

Honors 
 2019 - 2019 Miss & Mister Deaf World contest First Indian to be crowned as a Miss Deaf World.
 2019 - Miss India Deaf in Feb 2019
 2019 - National Disability Award for Role Model 
 2019 - Haryana Garima Award by Honourable MP Sirsa (Lok Sabha constituency), Sunita Duggal 
 Indian Icon award for Social Service and Glamour.
 Women Achievers Award by ZEE Media, Part of Zee_News 
 Inspirational Global Women Awards 2020  
 GLB Youth Icon Award  at GL Bajaj Institute of Technology and Management
 Service Excellence Award by Rotary Club
 2019- Indian Energy Talent Award 
 Appreciation Award by PHONAK
 2020- Awarded appreciation at World Women Leadership Awards
 Appreciation Award at Uttar Pradesh Sthapna Diwas
 Appreciation Award by Amar Ujala
 Shining Star Award by VLCC Institute
 Pride of The Nation - Inspirational Global Women Award

Sports 
 Silver Medal (Lawn Tennis) - XXII National Games of Deaf
 Silver Medal (Lawn Tennis) - XXI Nation Games of Deaf
 First round finalist (Women category) in AITA, All India Tennis Association Talent Series Tennis Tournament (May, 2015)
 Runner Up in National ranking AITA (Under-18) Championship (2014)
 Semi Finalist in National ranking AITA (TS-18) championship (May, 2014)
 Semi Finalist in National ranking AITA (TS-18) championship (Feb, 2014)
 Semi Finalist in North Zone Open AITA (TS-18) championship (Dec, 2013)
 Quarter Finalist in North Zone Open AITA (TS-18) championship (Nov’ 2013)
 Quarter Finalist in AITA Talent (U-14) Tennis Tournament (Dec, 2011)
 Runner Up in Tennis Sports GALA - 2011 in Delhi

Talks 
She has delivered many talks at the events organised by TED (conference) Community. Invited to speak about her life at many events to inspire thousands of people. Apart from these talks, she has been to many events as the chief guest. She was a guest of honour at Miss Teen India Universe 2020.

 Vidisha Baliyan shares her life story at TedxJnec 
 Inspiring youth at TEDxYouth@AISG46 to move beyond hurdles 
 TEDxLexiconMILE 
 TEDxSBSC
 TedxIIMCalcutta 
 TedxIMIB
 TedXIIMAMRITSAR 
 JoshTalks- A unique tale of defying odds to find success
 Indian Institute of Technology Roorkee -As a Speaker 
 Indian Institute of Management Visakhapatnam- Invited to speak on her life's journey
 A.D. Patel Institute of Technology, New Vallabh Vidyanagar, Gujarat - As a Speaker
 Lovely Professional University- As a Speaker
 Indian Institute of Management Indore- Invited as a Chief Guest and Jury

References 

1997 births
Living people
Indian female tennis players
Indian female models
Deaf beauty pageant contestants
Deaf tennis players
Indian deaf people
Racket sportspeople from Uttar Pradesh
Sportswomen from Uttar Pradesh
People from Muzaffarnagar